Keith John Benzies  OBE (19 June 1938 – 12 May 2002) was an Anglican bishop in Madagascar. He was the Bishop of Antsiranana from 1982 until his death in 2002.

Early life
Benzies was born in Stepps, Lanarkshire, the son of John Young Benzies, a professor of thermodynamics, (1914-1994) and his wife Jeanette Evelyn (née Beckett) (1913-1956). Both his mother and younger brother Roger died in the 1956 BOAC Argonaut accident at Kano Airport in Nigeria. Benzies was educated at the University of Glasgow, obtaining a MA in Czech and French in 1960.

Clerical career
Benzies trained for ordination at Salisbury Theological College, and was ordained deacon in 1962 and priest in 1963. He served his title at St Nicholas's Church, Hull (1962-1966).

For his second curacy, Benzies went to Madagascar as a USPG missionary. He was Vice-Principal of St Paul's Theological College, Ambatoharanana (1966-1969) and then Principal (1969-1979) as well as being concurrently, in part, Chancellor (1970-1975). He ran a home for 30 destitute boys. He was elected as the successor to the Rt Rev Gabriel Josoa as Bishop of Antsiranana in 1982. He was awarded an OBE in 1993.

Personal life
Benzies died in office in 2002, aged 63, from malaria. He was unmarried, but had many adopted children whom he put through education and into employment.

References

1938 births
2002 deaths
20th-century Anglican bishops in Africa
Alumni of the University of Glasgow